Arterial roads in Whitehorse, Yukon include:

Alaska Highway

The Alaska Highway is the core artery through Whitehorse, Yukon, Canada. As well as being part of the northwest North American key highway, it is also heavily used as a local arterial road connecting the various parts of Whitehorse.  Important public and commercial properties are located along the street.

The road was built in 1942, effectively expanding the Whitehorse community beyond the river valley known now as the downtown area; together with Two Mile Hill Road, the Whitehorse airport was linked with the community by the highway's construction (the original road at the west end of Main Street was closed due to serious erosion).  After the war ended in 1945, several developments added to the road's importance to the community, including subdivisions built for personnel of the Royal Canadian Air Force and the Canadian Army.  The Porter Creek subdivision was developed as part of efforts to clear the Whiskey Flats squatter areas in downtown.

A traffic circle adjoined the highway with Two Mile Hill Road and Range Road, but these were converted to T-intersections in 1969.  In 1971, the city limits of Whitehorse were extended west from 8th Avenue, north from the 2nd Avenue extension area and south from Robert Service Campground, encompassing the Alaska Highway almost as far south as Carcross Corners and to the west of the northbound Klondike Highway to Dawson.  Toward the end of the 1970s, additional subdivisions began to be developed in city lands along the highway.

A short section of the highway was widened to divided highway at the Two Mile Hill intersection in 1993, and another, shorter section was similarly widened at the Robert Service Way intersection in 2010.  In October 2014, the Yukon government announced plans to widen the entire corridor between the two Klondike Highway junctions, possibly to a divided four-lane road for that entire 32.3 km length.

The highway connects with Robert Service Way, Two Mile Hill Road, Range Road, Centennial Avenue, Clyde Wann Road and the North Klondike Highway (often known as the Mayo Road for its former terminus at the village of Mayo).  It also connects to the Cowley Creek subdivision via Salmon Trail, Mary Lake subdivision via Fireweed Drive, Wolf Creek subdivision via Dawson Road and Cronkhite Road, Mount Sima subdivision and ski facility via Mount Sima Road, Miles Canyon Road, Lo Bird subdivision via Robert Service Way, Hillcrest subdivision via Hillcrest Drive and Roundel Road, Valleyview subdivision via Sumanik Drive, Kulan Industrial via Laberge Road, and Crestview subdivision via Azure Road and Kathleen Road.

Major businesses and public properties along the road include Erik Nielsen International Airport (established in 1941 as an RCAF field on the Northwest Staging Route), the Yukon government highway weigh scale, the Beringia Centre museum (formerly a visitor information centre), and close by, Robert Lowe suspension bridge at Miles Canyon, the Miles Canyon Historical Railroad Society's "mining train" set-up, and the Canada Games Centre.

2nd Avenue

2nd Avenue is the main arterial, north-south route that roughly parallels the Yukon River in Whitehorse, Yukon, Canada. The downtown core of Whitehorse is developed partially along the route. 2nd Avenue is numbered as such as the second roadway from the Yukon River (1st Avenue, restored to its original name of Front Street in the 2010s, is a much shorter local street closer to the edge of the river). Many important public and commercial buildings in Whitehorse are located along the street.

2nd Avenue's north section, officially the "2nd Avenue Extension" past Black Street, continues along the same alignment to approximately four blocks north of Ogilvie, then turns west-southwest, passes the beginning of Quartz Road and ends at 4th Avenue, just south of where 4th Avenue becomes Two Mile Hill Road, which eventually leads to Yukon Highway 1 (Alaska Highway) and Yukon Highway 2 (Klondike Highway).

The south end of the road splits into two: Robert Service Way, which leads to Highway 1 as well, and Lewes Boulevard, which leads to the large subdivision of Riverdale.

Roads in downtown Whitehorse are named mostly after pioneers and well-known early Yukoners.

Landmarks along the route
 Whitehorse City Hall
 Yukon Territorial Government Building
 Yukon Visitor Information Center

4th Avenue

4th Avenue is an important secondary arterial, north-south route that roughly parallels the Yukon River in Whitehorse, Yukon, Canada. The downtown core of Whitehorse is developed partially along the route. 4th Avenue is numbered as such as the fourth roadway from the Yukon River. Many businesses and service establishments in Whitehorse are located along the street.

4th Avenue's north end, just past the intersection with 2nd Avenue, connects to Two Mile Hill Road, as one continuous route to meet the Alaska Highway.

The south end of the road, passing through a mostly residential area, meets Robert Service Way.

Landmarks along the route
 Qwanlin Mall
 Elijah Smith Federal Building

Two Mile Hill Road

Two Mile Hill Road is a main route that has long been the primary access (and until 1958, the only access) to the downtown area of Whitehorse. The original road wound hazardously down the escarpment, and was named for a commercial sign that indicated the distance to a specific business. In the early 1960s, a straight, steep-incline road, with two uphill lanes, was built from the Alaska Highway to the foot of the hill where it met Industrial Road, before hugging the escarpment again until it met 4th Avenue; the road met the Alaska Highway at a large traffic circle until the summer of 1969  when it was reconstructed as a T-intersection. The lower section of the road hugged the escarpment as the flat land was held by the White Pass & Yukon Route rail line. In 1993-94, the roadway was extensively rebuilt and relocated, as well as widened from two lanes to four, divided; the lower portion was relocated as the WP&YR intended to sell the adjacent land for development. The Alaska Highway intersection was moved to meet Hamilton Boulevard, making a four-way intersection, and traffic signals were installed.

Though a natural extension of 4th Avenue, the road retains its own identity and civic numbering for properties. The lower section of the road in particular is next to a large tract of land, long owned by White Pass, that was boreal forest until 1997, and has now been cleared, filled to raise it, and developed for "big box" stores such as Wal-Mart.

Roads in the Marwell Industrial area along Industrial Road are named after minerals.

Landmarks along the route
 Wal-Mart and Canadian Tire outlets

Robert Service Way

Robert Service Way is a main route that has long been the secondary access to the downtown area of Whitehorse. The road was hastily graded in 1958 during a major forest fire threatening the city, as a secondary evacuation route - the White Pass railway would also have served as an evacuation route. Motorists began using the roadway, however, necessitating upgrades and eventual paving, but the road grade was inferior. The route was completely rebuilt during 1997 and widened to a total of four lane capability, but only two lanes were built for the majority of the route.  In 2010, the road was extended west 750 m to a traffic circle to meet Hamilton Boulevard and the access to Lo-Bird Trailer Park.

The name Robert Service Way was not applied until approximately 1997; until then, it was known as the South Access Road.

Landmarks along the route
 Robert Service Campground
 Yukon Energy Corporation Schwatka Dam
 S.S. Klondike National Historic Site

Mountainview Drive

Mountainview Drive is a main route through the northeast parts of Whitehorse, serving as part of a series of connecting roads. The route begins at 2nd Avenue with Quartz Road, following this road nearly its entire length, then the route follows the entire length of Copper Road. Where Copper Road originally ended, Mountainview Drive itself begins. The road ends at the intersection where Hickory Street and 12th Avenue meet - a section of Hickory between 11th Avenue and 12th Avenue was regraded to serve as part of Mountainview.

The roadway was known as the Porter Creek Alternate Access, while a name was considered. One city councillor suggested naming it Lang Road after a municipal pioneer; another joked at renaming Porter Creek to "Tipperary" since it would be a "Lang Way to Tipperary". The name Mountainview Drive was shortly after chosen, and in fact, the road does offer stunning vistas of the mountains around the city.

The actual Mountainview Drive was constructed from 1980 to 1983, when it was opened to traffic between the end of Copper Road and the Hickory/12th intersection, at the southeast corner of a residential area. Motorists proceeding north along Hickory join with Clyde Wann Road, and west along 12th Avenue meet Centennial Street, which connects with the Alaska Highway.

Mountainview Drive has no development along its length, with the adjacent lands designated as open space in the municipal zoning bylaw. The road does, however pass adjacent to a small number of properties that are accessed from other streets.

Landmarks along the route
 Yukon Arts Centre

Range Road

Range Road is a main route through the northeast parts of Whitehorse. The road originally started at Two Mile Hill Road and ended in the Porter Creek Lower Bench area, as it split into access roads to various communications stations, including air navigation equipment, radio broadcast towers and sewage treatment plants. By 1971, it had been linked to the east end of Clyde Wann Road, but, north of Northland Trailer Park, it was a low-quality road, with a sub-standard grade and wild curves; it was upgraded and hard-surfaced in 1996. It was viewed in the late 1970s as an alternative to the Alaska Highway to reach Porter Creek from downtown, but viewed as inferior, costly to upgrade, and did not connect at Porter Creek in such a way as to attract much traffic flow. Mountainview Drive was constructed instead.

In 1993, the road was extended southward as a frontage road between the Alaska Highway and some businesses just south of Two Mile Hill, with a view to eventually extending it as far as the city airport.

The road provides access to mobile home parks, one of two city golf courses, as well as radio facilities and sewage treatment lagoons.

Roads in the Takhini Subdivision adjacent to Range Road are named after battlefields of the Second World War; the subdivision was, until 1968, the Canadian Army residential area, and until the 1990s, many homes were still owned by Public Works Canada.

With the development of the Porter Creek Lower Bench area in 2010-2011 as the new Whistle Bend subdivision, the northernmost portion of Range Road became Whistle Bend Way, connected to Mountainview Drive just south of its 12th Avenue terminus; Range Road has been aligned to adjoin Whistle Bend Way at a 3-way intersection.

Landmarks along the route
 Takhini Arena
 Yukon College and Yukon Arts Centre

Hamilton Boulevard

Hamilton Boulevard is a main route through the west part of Whitehorse. It was developed in the late 1970s to open up a large new residential area in anticipation of a boom brought by construction of a natural gas pipeline, but the boom never materialized. The road was opened in portions, the first 840 m as far as Sumanik Drive to access a ski chalet, then up to 2.5 km as far as McIntyre Road for the new Kwanlin Dun subdivision, then up to 3.65 km as far as Falcon Drive for the Granger, Arkell and Logan subdivisions, and finally a further 300 metre extension for the Copper Ridge subdivision.

As of 2010, Hamilton Boulevard extends south, and joins at a traffic circle with Robert Service Way to connect east to the Alaska Highway.  Construction began in 2008; the extension provides improved access to Lobird Trailer Court from the west side of the traffic circle.

The right-of-way and design can accommodate a divided four-lane road, but the road was originally built as a two-lane road. Circa 2005, some 2.5 km of the road's northern section was widened to two lanes southbound and a bicycle lane added for northbound traffic.

Roads in MacIntyre and Granger subdivisions are named after pioneer Yukoners, although the MacIntyre subdivision was developed in the late 1980s as the new location of the Kwanlin Dun First Nation community. Roads in Logan and Arkell subdivisions are named after birds; roads in Copper Ridge are named after gemstones.

Landmarks along the route
 Jeux du Canada Games Centre, central site of the 2007 Canada Winter Games
 winter sports facility that started as the Whitehorse Ski Chalet (cross-country skiing), further developed with a curling rink that has hosted national competitions such as the Air Canada Silver Broom

The Lobird Trailer Park includes a small, metal-clad apartment building. The building was actually constructed in the 1950s to take advantage of the location to carry out electronic eavesdropping on communications in the Soviet Union.  This activity ended in the late 1960s, and the building today is known as the Radar Apartments, though the term "radar" is loosely applied.

Lewes Boulevard

Lewes Boulevard is a main route through the east river bank part of Whitehorse. It starts at the Robert Campbell Bridge (which connects it to 2nd Avenue), passes through an institutional area of two schools and the former Yukon College site, then passes through a residential area where it ends. At two points, it connects with Alsek Road, which circles most of the outer perimeter of the Riverdale subdivision. Lewes also connects with Nisutlin Drive, which reaches the Schwatka Dam, and in turn connects with the Chadburn Lake Road to recreational areas.

Lewes Boulevard is, like all streets in Riverdale, named after a river in the Yukon, however, the river after which it is named, flowing from Marsh Lake to where it meets the Pelly River, is now part of the Yukon River.

Centennial Street

Centennial Street is a frontage road along the Alaska Highway through the Porter Creek subdivision; not including a 90-metre section of MacDonald Road that connects it back to the Alaska Highway at the north end, it is 2.34 kilometres long.

The road is made up of two segments of the old alignment of the Alaska Highway, connected by a newer roadway. Besides several older homes, it also has some of the few businesses that exist in the Porter Creek area. The street name probably refers to Canada's centennial year of 1967, shortly before which the roadway reverted to local road status from a part of the Alaska Highway.

Roads in Porter Creek are named after trees. Roads in nearby Kulan Industrial Subdivision and the nearby Crestview subdivision are named after lakes.

Clyde Wann Road

Wann Road, sometimes known by its full name Clyde Wann Road, is a main route through the northeast parts of Whitehorse, serving as the main arterial road in the northern part of Porter Creek. It begins at the Alaska Highway and ends at Hickory Street, where it connects to the north end of Whistle Bend Way. The road is mostly adjacent to residential areas.

The road is named after a pioneer Yukoner.

12th Avenue

12th Avenue is a main route through the northeast parts of Whitehorse, serving as the main arterial road in the southern part of Porter Creek. It begins at Centennial Street, close to access to the Alaska Highway, and ends at Hickory Street, where it connects to the north end of Mountainview Drive. The entire street is residential.  It was for many years into the mid-1980s the only paved road within Porter Creek.

Robert Campbell Bridge

The Robert Campbell Bridge, Whitehorse's only bridge over the Yukon River, links most of Whitehorse with the Riverdale subdivision and the city hospital. It was first constructed in the early 1950s, and damaged in the spring of 1973 when its abutments were eroded by the river. The bridge was closed for a long period of time, and traffic was rerouted over the Schwatka Dam, using one-way traffic. A Bailey bridge was finally installed and a new bridge was opened late in 1975. It is a two-lane bridge, and is vulnerable to blockage; an incident in 2007 during rush hour backed traffic up most of the length of 2nd Avenue. Discussions include hanging the sidewalks out over the side and converting their present space to allow a third lane with reversible flow.

Other subdivisions, accessed by way of the Alaska Highway or Klondike Highway:
 Hidden Valley and MacPherson - streets named after berries, and others after pioneer residents
 Hillcrest - uncertain naming scheme
 Pineridge - streets named after mountains
 Wolf Creek, Mount Sima Industrial - streets named after pioneers
 MacRae - streets named after stops and stations on the White Pass and Yukon Route railway
 Mary Lake - streets named after flowers found in the Yukon
 Cowley Creek - streets named after fish species

References

Transport in Whitehorse
Roads in Yukon